Dunwoody may refer to:

Dunwoody, Georgia, United States, a city
Dunwoody High School
Dunwoody (MARTA station), an elevated train station
Dunwoody College of Technology, a vocational college in Minneapolis, Minnesota
Dunwoody (surname)
Dunwoodie, Yonkers
Saint Joseph's Seminary (Dunwoodie), also known as Dunwoody